The Bulldogs were WCHA regular season, WCHA playoff champions, and NCAA Frozen Four champions.

Player stats
Note: GP= Games played; G= Goals; A= Assists; PTS = Points; PIM = Penalties in Minutes; GW = Game Winning Goals; PPL = Power Play Goals; SHG = Short Handed Goals

Postseason

NCAA Frozen Four

March 15: The Bulldogs overcome three, one-goal deficits and defeat the Mercyhurst Lakers by a 5–4 score in the NCAA Quarterfinals.
March 20: Kim Martin made 41 saves against New Hampshire as the Bulldogs advanced to the NCAA championship game.  The Bulldogs won by a 3–2 score.
March 22: The Bulldogs defeat Wisconsin 4–0 in Duluth to win their fourth NCAA title.  It is only the second shutout in championship game history.
Sophomore netminder Kim Martin is named the 2008 NCAA Frozen Four’s Most Outstanding Player after making 28 saves against the Badgers and 69 over the tournament.
2008 Frozen Four All-Tournament team: Sara O’Toole, Laura Fridfinnson, Myriam Trepanier, Heidi Pelttari, Kim Martin.

Awards and honors
December 5: Freshman forward Iya Gavrilova and sophomore Kim Martin takes home USCHO.com Defensive Player of the Week honors, while Gavrilova picks up USCHO.com Offensive Player of the Week accolades.
February 26, 2008: Sophomore goaltender Kim Martin is named a 2008 Patty Kazmaier Top-10 Finalist.  She is the tenth Maroon and Gold player to be recognized as a top-10 finalist, and is the second netminder to land the honor.
March 12: Kim Martin, Top Three finalist, Patty Kazmaier Award (Martin became the fifth top-three finalist from UMD to gain the honor) 
June 26: The Bulldogs make their fourth visit to the White House. The Bulldogs are honored in a Rose Garden ceremony with President George W. Bush.
Haley Irwin is named the WCHA Rookie of the Year, only the second Bulldog ever to collect the honor.
Haley Irwin, All-WCHA First Team
Haley Irwin, All-WCHA Rookie Team
Kim Martin, All-WCHA First Team
Saara Tuominen, All-WCHA Third Team
Jocelyne Larocque, All-WCHA Third Team.
Jocelyne Larocque, All-WCHA Rookie Team.

References

External links
Official site

Minnesota-Duluth
NCAA women's ice hockey Frozen Four seasons
NCAA women's ice hockey championship seasons
Minnesota Duluth Bulldogs women's ice hockey seasons